On string instruments, a stopped note is a note whose pitch has been altered from the pitch of the open string by the player's left hand pressing (stopping) the string against the fingerboard.

Bowed strings

On bowed string instruments, a stopped note is a played note that is fingered with the left hand, i.e. not an open string. This assists with tone production, the addition of vibrato, and sometimes additional volume but creates difficulty in that bowed string instruments do not have frets, requiring ear training and accurate finger placement. The lack of frets, as on the guitar fretboard, does allow greater variability in intonation though a bowed string instrumentalist, such as a violinist, "when unaccompanied, does not play consistently in either the tempered or the natural scale, but tends on the whole to conform with the Pythagorean scale"

The open notes of the highest three strings may be played as stopped notes on the lowest three strings, offering advantages and disadvantages:

Fingered tremolos, the rapid alternation of two notes, are best between two stopped notes on one string, in which case it is limited to the interval of an augmented fourth, or between stopped notes on two adjacent strings:

Plucked strings

On plucked string instruments with frets, such as the guitar, the pitch of a stopped note is determined by the left hand pressing (stopping) the string at one of the frets.

Sources

String performance techniques